Theo Polhaupessy (born 5 June 1933) is a former Indonesian cyclist. He competed in the individual road race and team time trial events at the 1960 Summer Olympics.

References

External links
 

1933 births
Living people
Indonesian male cyclists
Olympic cyclists of Indonesia
Cyclists at the 1960 Summer Olympics
Sportspeople from Malang
20th-century Indonesian people